Loop 322 is a  loop route in the city of Abilene in the U.S. state of Texas.  It is located in Taylor County.

Until the late 1990s, virtually all of Loop 322 was a two-lane freeway.  Today, virtually all of the road has been upgraded to typical freeway standards, except its northern terminus, which is an at-grade intersection with the service roads of Interstate 20.

Route description
Loop 322 starts at its junction with the Winters Freeway (US 83 and US 84) and Treadaway Blvd about 1 mile north of Abilene Regional Medical Center and continues north towards Interstate 20. Loop 322 passes through one of the fastest growing areas of Abilene right before Abilene Regional Airport. After the airport, Loop 322 continues about 2.4 miles to its northern terminus at Interstate 20. Loop 322 mainly traverses rural parts of eastern Abilene.

History
Loop 322 was designated on July 16, 1957, running from US 80 (now Business I-20) to SH 36. On June 26, 1962, it extended north to Interstate 20.  On June 28, 1963, it extended south to US 83 and US 84, completing its current routing.

Junction list

References

322
Freeways in Texas
Transportation in Taylor County, Texas